Ian Moo-Young's talents were noticed at an early age in Kingston Jamaica and he received a scholarship from the British Council to study at Central Saint Martins College of Art & Design.

An animator and graphic design artist, Moo-Young has enjoyed a long and varied career. A pioneer of British animation, he also had great success in the field of advertising, and his pioneering work led to a Bafta nomination in 1979 for "Read All About It". Whilst providing animation for "Kama Sutra Rides Again" he worked under Bob Godfrey, best known for his work on Roobarb. He made TV commercials for Swissair, Kellogg's Rice Krispies, British Rail, Club Med and the first-ever on-air tampon commercial.

Moo-Young currently resides in Canada with his wife.

Filmography

References

External links
 Trebor Dandies: Norman Normal
 Ian Moo-Young's linkedin profile

Living people
1943 births